Ethminolia eudeli is a species of sea snail, a marine gastropod mollusk, in the subfamily Umboniinae of the family Trochidae.

Distribution
This marine species occurs in the Indian Ocean off Réunion.

References

External links
 Deshayes, G. P. (1863). Catalogue des mollusques de l'île de la Réunion (Bourbon). Pp. 1-144. In Maillard, L. (Ed.) Notes sur l'Ile de la Réunion. Dentu, Paris.
 Herbert, D. G. (1992). Revision of the Umboniinae (Mollusca: Prosobranchia: Trochidae) in southern Africa and Mozambique. Annals of the Natal Museum. 33(2):379-459

Trochidae